All of This Life is the second studio album by American rock band The Record Company. The album was released on June 22, 2018, and features the singles "Life to Fix" and "Make It Happen".

Singles 
The Record Company announced the lead single of the album, "Life to Fix" on April 8, 2018, on their Instagram. The song was later released on April 18, 2018 along with a lyric video. A music video was later released for the song on June 8, 2018. "Life to Fix" reached number one on the Adult Alternative Songs Chart. The second single from the album, "Make It Happen", was released on September 19, 2018, along with a music video.

Promotion 
The All of This Life Tour started on September 14, 2018.

Chart performance 
All of This Life debuted at number 94 on the Billboard 200, selling 7,000 copies in its first week. It also peaked at number 9 on the Alternative Albums chart.

Track listing

Charts

References 

2018 albums